Melanocichla is a genus of birds in the Old World babbler family Timaliidae.

Taxonomy
The genus Melanocichla was introduced in 1883 by the English ornithologist Richard Bowdler Sharpe to accommodate a single species, the black laughingthrush, which is therefore the type species of the genus. The name combines the Ancient Greek melas meaning "black" with kikhlkikhlē meaning "thrush".

Species
The genus contains the following species:

References